Police band may refer to:

 The range of frequencies used by police radios, see spectrum management
 Police band (music), set up by a police force
 The Police, a British rock band